Mae Madison (born Mariska Megyzsi, September 17, 1915November 1, 2004) was an American film actress. She was born in Los Angeles, California. Her parents were from Hungary. 

Madison started out as a dancer in the late 1920s. She signed a contract with Warner Bros. and appeared in several films in the 1930s. She had supporting roles in films such as Bought, Her Majesty, Love, The Mouthpiece, So Big, and The Big Stampede. In 2000, she took part in the documentary I Used to be in Pictures, which featured many actresses from the early years of Hollywood.

Madison died in Los Angeles on November 1, 2004, at the age of 89.

Personal life
Madison was married three times. She married the film director William C. McGann in 1932. They divorced in 1933. She was married to musical playwright Jack MacGowan between 1935 and 1937. She married Aristide D'Angelo, a theatre professor, in 1939. He died in 1960.

Filmography

References

External links

1915 births
2004 deaths
American film actresses
American people of Hungarian descent
21st-century American women